Sveinbjörn Hákonarson (born 1 November 1957) is a retired Icelandic football midfielder.

References

1957 births
Living people
Sveinbjoern Hakonarson
Sveinbjoern Hakonarson
Sveinbjoern Hakonarson
Sveinbjoern Hakonarson
Sveinbjoern Hakonarson
Association football midfielders
Sveinbjoern Hakonarson
Expatriate footballers in Sweden
Sveinbjoern Hakonarson
Sveinbjoern Hakonarson